Wyzant is an online service marketplace in educational technology for matching tutors with students. This organization is headquartered in Chicago, Illinois, and is a division of IXL Learning.

Wyzant was co-founded in 2005 by Princeton graduates Andrew Geant and Mike Weishuhn with $10,000 raised from family and friends.  In 2013, Accel Partners invested $21.5 million into Wyzant.

In 2014, Wyzant had 80 employees and listed about 76,000 active tutors in its database. It claims to have about 2 million registered users, from kindergarteners to PhD candidates.In 2014, the company claims to have booked $100 million in tutoring sessions and claims to have logged almost 2.5 million hours of instruction.

Wyzant claims to teach more than 300 subjects online and in person to its users.

In 2018, Wyzant ranked #5 on Indeed's list of top rated workplaces in Chicago.

References

Further reading
 Las Vegas Sun
 Crains.
 TechCrunch
 TechCrunch
 Chicago Tribune
 Crains

Companies based in Chicago
Distance education institutions based in the United States
Educational technology companies of the United States